The Central Ontario Women's Hockey League  (COWHL) is a defunct hockey league in Ontario, Canada. During the 1998-99 season, the COWHL was renamed the National Women's Hockey League as the teams from the former league began to compete against teams from Quebec.

Teams
Guelph Eagles
Hamilton Golden Hawks
London Devilettes
Mississauga Chiefs
Newtonbrook Panthers
Peterborough Skyway
Peterborough Pirates
Junior Aeros
Scarborough Firefighters
Scarborough Sting
North York Aeros
Toronto Red Wings

Final Standing year by year

1992-93

1993-94

1994-95
Non-available

1995-96

1996-97

1997-98
For this last season, there was only three teams in the COWHL. The three teams played each other five times at home and five times on the road. In addition, they will play exhibition games against the Ottawa Senior AAA and the Brockvill Senior AAA teams.

Players
Geraldine Heaney began playing for the Toronto Aeros at the age of 13, winning six provincial championships.
For the first 17 years of her participation in the COWHL, Cathy Phillips played for two different teams: Burlington and Hamilton. She was voted Top Goaltender 14 times and Most Valuable Player twice during her years of play in the COWHL.

International

IIHF women's worlds
Mirjam Baechler, Newtonbrook Panthers (Team Switzerland 1992-1997) 
Amanda Benoit, North York Aeros (Team Canada 1996)
Cassie Campbell, North York Aeros (Team Canada 1994, 1995, 1996, 1997)
Lori Dupuis, Newtonbrook Panthers (Team Canada 1995, 1996, 1997)
Kelly Dyer, North York Aeros (Team USA 1990, 1992, 1994, 1995)
Marianne Grnak, North York Aeros (Team Canada 1994, 1995, 1996)
Geraldine Heaney, North York Aeros (Team Canada 1990, 1992, 1994, 1996, 1997)
Jayna Hefford, Mississauga Chiefs (Team Canada 1997)
Andria Hunter, Newtonbrook Panthers (Team Canada 1992, 1994)
Angela James, Newtonbrook Panthers (Team Canada 1990, 1992, 1994, 1996, 1997)
Sari Krooks, North York Aeros (Team Finland 1990, 1992, 1994, 1996)
Sue Merz, Newtonbrook Panthers (Team USA 1990, 1992, 1994, 1995, 1996, 1997)
Karen Nystrom, Newtonbrook Panthers (Team Canada 1992, 1994, 1996, 1997)
Margot Page, Mississauga Chiefs (Team Canada 1990, 1992, 1994)
Marion Pepels, London Devilettes (Team Netherlands 1990-1996)
Cheryl Pounder, North York Aeros (Team Canada 1994, 1996)
Nathalie Rivard, Mississauga Chiefs (Team Canada 1992)
Laura Schuler, Newtonbrook Panthers (Team Canada 1990, 1992, 1995, 1996, 1997)
Jeanine Sobek, Newtonbrook Panthers (Team USA 1990, 1992, 1994, 1995, 1996)
Vicky Sunohara, Scarborough Firefighters (1990 to 1994), Toronto Red Wings (1994 to 1996), and the Newtonbrook Panthers (1996 to 1997) (Team Canada 1990, 1996, 1997)

Olympians
The following players from the COWHL represented Canada in ice hockey at the Winter Olympic games.

Awards and honors
Angela James, Most Valuable Player, COWHL, 1991
Karen Nystrom, Won COWHL scoring title in 1991-92 (runner-up in 1990-91, 1992–93 and
1996-97)
 Karen Nystrom, COWHL All-Star Team every year from 1989 to 1997
 Karen Nystrom, OWHA champion with Scarborough Firefighters, 1991

Esso Nationals
Over the years, teams from the COWHL represented the province of Ontario in the Canadian National Women's Hockey championships (also known as the Esso Nationals). The winner of the gold medal was also awarded the Abby Hoffman Cup.

Beatrice Aeros, Silver medal, 1996
 Beatrice Aeros, Bronze Medal, 1999.

See also
 National Women's Hockey League (1999) NWHL was in service between 1998 and 2007.

References

External links
 Central Ontario Women's Hockey League : 1992-93
  Central Ontario Women's Hockey League : 1993-94
  Central Ontario Women's Hockey League : 1995-96
  Central Ontario Women's Hockey League : 1996-97
  Central Ontario Women's Hockey League : 1997-98

Women's ice hockey leagues in Canada
Defunct ice hockey leagues in Ontario
National Women's Hockey League (1999–2007)